Michał Krystian Wiśniewski (born 9 September 1972 in Łódź) is a Polish pop vocalist, leader of the pop group Ich Troje, who sang for Poland at the 2003 and 2006 Eurovision Song Contests. He is known for his characteristic red hair, but his hair has been green, black and white in the past.

Biography 

Michał was raised in Poland by his grandmother and after her death he lived in Germany with his aunt's family. He holds both, Polish and German citizenship. He has two brothers, Jakub and Jarosław. Wiśniewski had no contact with his mother Grażyna during his childhood. They renewed their contact in the 2000s. Mrs. Wiśniewska lives in Michał's flat in Warsaw.

In Poland he is known for being the leader of the pop group Ich Troje. Wiśniewski created this group in 1995 with Jacek Łągwa and Magda Femme (Wiśniewski married Femme one year later). Femme was Ich Troje's first vocalist from 1995 to 2001. Their next vocalist was Justyna Majkowska from 2001 to 2003 and in this time Ich Troje was the most popular pop group in Poland. They represented Poland at the 2003 Eurovision with the song Keine Grenzen. They placed seventh, the second best result for Poland at Eurovision (after Edyta Górniak's second place in 1994). Then Justyna Majkowska left the group. In 2003 Wiśniewski chose a new vocalist, Anna Świątczak who won the special eliminations in the TVP show Szansa na sukces. Michał married Anna in 2006. That same year Ich Troje won the Polish eliminations in the 2006 Eurovision Song Contest with the song Follow my heart. Former Ich Troje vocalists, Justyna Majkowska and Magda Femme and Real McCoy were invited to perform with Michał Wiśniewski, Jacek Łągwa and Anna Wiśniewska. Ich Troje failed to reach the finals in Athens. Anna Wiśniewska left the group in 2010 to start her solo career. She divorced Michał in June 2011.

The fourth Ich Troje vocalist was Norwegian Jeanette Vik. In 2011 Michał took part in the TVP show Bitwa na głosy. He represented Łódź, Poland and found sixteen talented vocalists from that city to perform different songs. They were eliminated in the fourth episode and placed seventh. One of the girls who sang on this team, Justyna Panfilewicz became the fifth Ich Troje vocalist in 2011.

Ich Troje released eight albums from 1996 to 2008. The most popular are Ad. 4 (2001) and Po piąte... a niech gadają (2002). Their sixth album, 6-ty ostatni przystanek (2004) was thought to be the last album of that group but after a few years they reunited and released their seventh album 7 grzechów głównych in 2006.

Wiśniewski has played in two films: Star (Polish: Gwiazdor) (2002) and Lawstorant (2005).
He took part in a TVN reality show I Am What I Am and the reality show Show Your Face for VIVA! Poland television. He also founded the band Red Head.

Personal life 
Michał Wiśniewski has been married five times, has five children and four stepchildren.

In 1996 he married Magda Femme, a singer and Ich Troje's first vocalist, in a civil ceremony. They divorced in 2001. In November 2013 Wiśniewski stated in an interview that he proposed to Femme after taking LSD. Their marriage was kept secret in order to save the popularity of the band. Before their divorce, Michał accused Magda of being a lesbian and having an affair with her manager.

In 2000 he started dating Ich Troje's new dancer, Marta Mandrykiewicz. They married in a civil ceremony in 2002 and on June 24, 2002 their son, Xavier Michał Wiśniewski, was born in Warsaw. On August 21, 2003 Marta gave birth in Warsaw to their second child, Fabienne Marta Wiśniewska. On December 10, 2003 they had a religious wedding in Sweden and it was transmitted on Polish television. Michał filed for divorce from his wife in 2005, announcing their separation on September 15. Their divorce was finalized on April 18, 2006.

In 2003, he met Anna Świątczak, whom he selected as Ich Troje's next vocalist after her performance at the Polish music show Szansa na sukces. They married in Las Vegas in February 2006. Michał and Anna have two daughters: Etienette Anna Wiśniewska (born September 17, 2006 in Warsaw) and Vivienne Vienna Wiśniewska (born February 2, 2008 in Warsaw). On March 1, 2007, Wiśniewski announced that he and his wife were expecting a son, Falco Christian. The pregnancy ended in miscarriage in May 2007. In July 2010, Anna announced her separation from Michał and they divorced on June 26, 2011.

On July 11, 2011, Wiśniewski announced his engagement to Dominika Tajner-Idzik, daughter of Apoloniusz Tajner. They married on June 30, 2012 near Pisz and divorced on September 30, 2019 in Warsaw. Michał was a stepfather to Dominika's son from her first marriage, Maksymilian Idzik.

In December 2019, Michał got engaged to 36-year-old Paulina, a divorced mother of four children, whom he met via the internet months earlier. Their civil wedding took place in Magdalenka in April 2020. His second son, Falco Amadeus Wiśniewski, was born on January 30, 2021. On 4 October 2022 Michał and his fifth wife announced another pregnancy.

Marriages and descendents 
 married Magda Femme in a civil ceremony in 1996, they divorced in 2001;
 married Marta Mandrykiewicz in a civil ceremony in 2002 and in religious ceremony in 2003, they divorced in 2006;
 son Xavier Michał Wiśniewski born in June 2002;
 daughter Fabienne Marta Wiśniewska born in August 2003;
 married Anna Świątczak in a civil ceremony in 2006, they divorced in 2011;
 daughter Etienette Anna Wiśniewska born in September 2006;
 son Falco Christian Wiśniewski miscarried in May 2007;
 daughter Vivienne Vienna Wiśniewska born in February 2008;
 married Dominika Tajner-Idzik in a civil ceremony in 2012, they divorced in 2019;
 married Pola Wiśniewska in a civil ceremony in 2020;
 son Falco Amadeus Wiśniewski born in January 2021;
 child expected in 2023.

Discography

References

External links

 Official website of Michał Wiśniewski
 Photos of Michał Wiśniewski home

Living people
1972 births
Musicians from Łódź
Polish pop singers
Eurovision Song Contest entrants for Poland
Eurovision Song Contest entrants of 2003
Eurovision Song Contest entrants of 2006
Polish poker players
20th-century Polish male singers
21st-century Polish male singers
21st-century Polish singers